County routes in Orange County, New York, are maintained by the Orange County Department of Public Works. Most routes are signed with the Manual on Uniform Traffic Control Devices-standard yellow-on-blue pentagon route marker; however, some routes are still signed with white-on-blue diamond-shaped route markers that predate the introduction of the standard marker. These markers are unique to Orange and Ulster Counties and display the route's designation inside an outline of the county. Route numbers are not assigned in any fixed pattern.


Routes 1–50

Routes 51 and up

See also

County routes in New York

References

External links

Empire State Roads – Orange County Roads